The 6.5mm Grendel is an intermediate cartridge jointly designed by British-American armorer Bill Alexander, competitive shooter Arne Brennan (of Houston, Texas) and Lapua ballistician Janne Pohjoispää, as a low-recoil, high-precision rifle cartridge specifically for the AR-15 platform at medium/long range (200–800 yard).  It is an improved variation of the 6.5mm PPC.

The 6.5mm Grendel cartridge was first unveiled in May 2003 at the Blackwater Training Facility in North Carolina, where it remained supersonic at  range and out-shot the 7.62mm NATO with only half the recoil. Since its introduction, it has proven to be a versatile cartridge and is now expanding into other firearm design platforms including bolt-action rifles and the Kalashnikov system.

The name "Grendel" is inspired by the mythical monster antagonist from the Old English epic poem Beowulf.  It was a trademark owned by Alexander Arms (Bill Alexander's company in Radford, Virginia) and manufactured at Radford Arsenal, until legally released in 2010 for SAAMI standardization with collaboration from Hornady.

Development and history
The goal of the 6.5mm Grendel design was to create an effective STANAG magazine-length cartridge for the AR-15 platform that could reach  and surpass the performance of the native 5.56mm NATO/.223 Remington cartridge. Constrained by the dimension of the STANAG magazines, the Grendel's designers decided to use a shorter, larger-diameter case for higher powder volume while allowing space for the long, streamlined, high ballistic coefficient 6.5mm (.264 cal.) bullets. Depending on their case material and bullet weight, 6.5mm Grendel cartridges weigh .

The case head diameter of the Grendel is the same as that of the .220 Russian, 7.62×39mm and 6.5mm PPC cases.  This diameter is larger than the 5.56×45mm NATO, thereby necessitating the use of a non-standard AR-15 bolt.  The increased case diameter results in a small reduction in the magazine ammo capacities.  A 6.5mm Grendel magazine with the same dimensions as a 30-round STANAG magazine will hold 26 rounds of Grendel ammunition.

Performance

Proponents assert that the Grendel is a good "middle ground" between the 5.56×45mm NATO and the 7.62×51mm NATO.  It retains greater terminal energy at extended ranges than either of these cartridges due to its higher ballistic coefficient (BC). 

In order to obtain ballistics that are superior to the 7.62×51mm cartridge, a weapon with a longer barrel and firing a heavier bullet is necessary.  To achieve the same results from shorter-length barrels, even heavier bullets are needed.

External ballistics

As noted above, the Grendel case is very closely related to the .220 Russian case. In general, each additional grain of bullet weight will reduce muzzle velocity by 10.8 ft/s (50.8 m/s for each gram) and each additional inch of barrel length will increase muzzle velocity by 20 ft/s (2.4 m/s for each centimeter). Specific details are available as graphs derived from Alexander Arms' public domain load table linked below.

Army and police uses 
Serbia is in process of adopting a rifle made by Zastava Arms in 6.5 mm Grendel caliber as main armament for its armed forces. The rifle, designated M17, is a derivative of the previous-issue M70 rifle. An American-manufactured rifle in 6.5mm Grendel caliber may also be adopted in armament for special forces units after it passes testing in Technical Testing Center.  Three types of 6.5mm Grendel ammunition produced by Prvi Partizan Užice Serbia will be tested for use with these rifles.

See also
 .220 Russian (5.6×39 mm)
 .224 Valkyrie (5.6×41 mm)
 6mm PPC
 6mm AR, a 6 mm wildcat version which shares 6.5 Grendel's casing, but sends a (usually) lighter projectile up to 1,000 yards (900 m).
 6mm ARC, a factory cartridge with many similarities to the 6mm AR
 6.5×55mm Swedish
 6.5mm Creedmoor
 6.5×42mm, also known as 6.5 MPC (Multi Purpose Cartridge), based on a necked up .223 Remington case.
 6.8mm Remington SPC
 7.62×39mm
 List of AR platform cartridges
 List of rifle cartridges
 Table of handgun and rifle cartridges

References

Bibliography

 Guns 'n' Ammo: Book of the AR-15, 2004, "The 6.5mm Grendel", David Fortier, p. 66.
 Special Weapons for Military & Police, Annual #27 2004, "Beyond the 5.56mm NATO", Stan Crist, pp. 62–67.
 Guns 'n' Ammo: Book of the AR-15, 2005, "6.5mm Grendel and 6.8 SPC", David Fortier, pp. 32–44.
 Shooting Times, February 2005, "Cooking up Loads for the 6.5mm Grendel", David Fortier, pp. 52–56.
 Shooting Illustrated, September 2005, "6.5mm Grendel and Alexander Arms", J. Guthrie, pp. 34–37, 67–69.
 Petersen's: Rifle Shooter, March/April 2006, "Cartridge Efficiency—Why case shape matters", M. L. McPherson, pp. 22–24.
 Shooting Times, January 2007, "Other AR Chamberings", Sidebar Article, David Fortier, p. 56.
 Special Weapons, Semi-Annual #50 2007, "The Super Versatile AR", Charlie Cutshaw, pp. 44–45, 80–83.
 Special Weapons, Semi-Annual #50 2007, "5.56mm NATO Alternatives", Stan Crist, pp. 52–59.
 Shooting Times, March 2007, "Les Baer's 6.5mm Grendel AR Sets a New Standard", David Fortier, pp. 26–32.
 Special Weapons for Military & Police #52, Spring 2007, "BETTER-IDEA 6.5mm GRENDEL", Stan Crist
 Special Weapons for Military & Police'' #52, Spring 2007, "New Battlefield Requirements—New Rifles and Ammo Needed", Charlie Cutshaw

External links

 http://www.alexanderarms.com/

Pistol and rifle cartridges